Steinthal is an unincorporated community in the Town of Eaton, Manitowoc County, Wisconsin, United States. The community had a post office and general store.

Images

Notes

Unincorporated communities in Manitowoc County, Wisconsin
Unincorporated communities in Wisconsin